Cogswell is a surname, derived from the town of Coggeshall in Essex. Notable people with the surname include:

A. E. Cogswell, British architect
Alice Cogswell, deaf American
Bryce Cogswell, computer expert
Fred Cogswell, Canadian poet
Henry D. Cogswell, dentist
Henry Hezekiah Cogswell, (1776-1854) Nova Scotia lawyer
John Cogswell, early American colonist
Joseph Cogswell, 19th-century bibliographer and educator
Mason Fitch Cogswell, American physician
Sue Cogswell, English squash player
Theodore Cogswell, American science fiction author
William F. Cogswell (1819–1903), American portrait painter

References

English toponymic surnames